The Rat Saviour is a 1976 Croatian fantasy horror film directed by Krsto Papić. It was released in 1976, but won Best Film at the 1980 Paris Festival and 1982 Fantasporto. The film was selected as the Yugoslav entry for the Best Foreign Language Film at the 49th Academy Awards, but was not accepted as a nominee.

In 1999, a poll of Croatian film critics found it to be one of the best Croatian films ever made.

Plot

A man uncovers a race of intelligent rats who can appear as human. He is captured and taken to the rat people's leader (the "savior" of the movie's title). He escapes, but then wonders who among his fellow humans is a rat person in disguise.

Cast
Ivica Vidović – Ivan Gajski
Mirjana Majurec – Sonja Bošković
Fabijan Šovagović – Professor Martin Bošković
Relja Bašić – Mayor
Ilija Ivezić – Police Chief

See also
 List of submissions to the 49th Academy Awards for Best Foreign Language Film
 List of Yugoslav submissions for the Academy Award for Best Foreign Language Film

References

External links
 

1976 films
1976 horror films
1970s Croatian-language films
Jadran Film films
Films set in the 1930s
Films based on Russian novels
Films directed by Krsto Papić
Yugoslav science fiction films
Croatian science fiction horror films
1970s science fiction horror films
Films set in Yugoslavia
Films about mice and rats